Dittoceras is a genus of plant in family Apocynaceae first described as a genus in 1883. They are native to the Himalayas and to southeast Asia.

Species
 Dittoceras andersonii Hook.f. - Sikkim in the Himalayas of NE India
 Dittoceras garrettii Kerr - Thailand
 Dittoceras maculatum Kerr - Thailand
 Dittoceras stellaris (Ridl.) Bullock - Peninsular Malaysia

References

Apocynaceae genera
Asclepiadoideae
Taxa named by Joseph Dalton Hooker